Leonard Micklem (12 March 1845 — 7 July 1919) was an English first-class cricketer and railway secretary.

Life
The son of Nathaniel Micklem, he was born in March 1845 at Henley-on-Thames. The Micklem's were an old Nonconformist family. He was educated at Eton College, before going up to Merton College, Oxford. He played first-class cricket for the Marylebone Cricket Club (MCC) against Oxford University Cricket Club at Oxford in 1869. Batting once in the match, he was dismissed for 9 runs in the MCC first innings by Bernard Pauncefote. As a cricketer he was described by Wisden while playing school cricket for Eton as "a good and sure bat, playing in splendid form; a great punisher of loose bowling; a brilliant field at long-leg, a fine thrower and safe catch." Micklem was a prominent figure in the Brazilian railway industry, being elected secretary to the Bahia and San Francisco Railway Company in March 1880. He died at Elstree in July 1919.

Family
From his first marriage to Dora Emily Weguelin, Micklem had as son the clergyman Philip Micklem,. Another son, from his second marriage to Nanette Fenwick, was Robert Micklem, a Commander in the Royal Navy.

References

External links

1845 births
1919 deaths
People from Henley-on-Thames
People educated at Eton College
Alumni of Merton College, Oxford
English cricketers
Marylebone Cricket Club cricketers
English expatriates in Brazil